"Chorus" is a song by English synth-pop duo Erasure, released as the first single from their fifth studio album of the same name (1991). Produced by Martyn Phillips and written by Erasure members Vince Clarke and Andy Bell, the song features Clarke's electronic soundscapes and Phillips' computerised production. The single was released by Mute Records in the UK and Sire Records in the US. It peaked at number three in both Denmark and the UK, while reaching number four in Ireland. In the US, it peaked at number 83 on the Billboard Hot 100 and number four on the Billboard Modern Rock Tracks chart.

Critical reception
AllMusic editor Ned Raggett described the song as "another great Erasure anthem". Larry Flick from Billboard wrote, "Fab British duo makes a welcome return with an environmentally-conscious techno ditty. Singer Andy Bell is in fine voice on this track". Bill Wyman from Entertainment Weekly stated that it "percolates along nicely". The Daily Vault's Michael R. Smith commented, "Yes, the title track has the glaringly errant word "fishes" in the lyrics, but the contagious feel of the music makes up for it." A reviewer from Dundee Courier viewed it as a "refreshing burst of pure pop". 

Andrew Smith of Melody Maker praised the song as "absolutely bloody marvellous" and commented, "The familiar hyperactive throbs and skyward spiralling melodies are here and, as ever, few manage to say nothing with such passion and alacrity as Bell. As it happens, we instinctively know what he means anyway, a sure sign there we're in the presence of greatness." David Quantick of NME commented, "It has got a great, um, chorus, some splendid bleeping noises and a chirpy lyric about ecology. There is surely no other criterion for a good record in the 1990s."

Chris Gerard from Metro Weekly called it an "old-school disco raver", that is "driven by frenetic beat, streams of keyboards that sound like lasers beaming into space, and an unforgettable melody sung with great soul by Andy Bell." He added that "Chorus" is one of the Erasure's "signature songs and finest moments." Pan-European magazine Music & Media noted, "You can hear that these two know what's going on in the clubs without forcing themselves to follow the current dance trend. Melody is their specialty, best witnessed by the title track." Christopher Smith from TalkAboutPopMusic stated that it "kicks off" the album "in fine style". Also he noted "memorable lines", like "Go ahead with your dreamin'", "your schemin'", "and something about the fishes in the sea!"

Chart performance
Issued prior to the release of the Chorus album, the single returned Erasure to the upper reaches of the UK Singles Chart, debuting and peaking at number three for two weeks. It was also a success in Denmark, Ireland and Switzerland, reaching number three, four and ten. In the United States, the single became Erasure's first Billboard Hot 100 entry since "Stop!" in 1989, climbing to number 83. It was more successful on the Billboard Modern Rock Tracks chart, where it peaked at number four to become the band's highest-placing song on this listing.

Track listings

 7-inch and cassette single (MUTE125; CMUTE125)
 "Chorus"
 "Over the Rainbow"

 12-inch single (12MUTE125)
 "Chorus" (Pure Trance Mix)
 "Chorus"
 "Snappy" (The Spice Has Risen mix)
 "Chorus" (Transdental trance mix)

 CD single (CDMUTE125)
 "Chorus"
 "Chorus" (Transdental Trance mix)
 "Snappy"
 "Over the Rainbow"

 US CD single (9 40123-2)
 "Chorus (Covered Up The Sun)" (single mix by Dave Bascombe)
 "Chorus (Covered Up The Sun)" (Pure Trance mix by Youth)
 "Snappy" (12-inch remix by Martyn Phillips)
 "Chorus (Covered Up The Sun)" (Aggressive trance mix by Youth)
 "Chorus (Covered Up The Sun)" (Transdental trance mix by Youth)
 "Snappy" (The Spice has risen mix by Justin Robertson)
 "Over the Rainbow"

Charts

Weekly charts

Year-end charts

References

1991 singles
1991 songs
Erasure songs
Music videos directed by David Mallet (director)
Mute Records singles
Sire Records singles
Songs written by Andy Bell (singer)
Songs written by Vince Clarke
UK Independent Singles Chart number-one singles